Blenstrup, is a village with a population of 536 (1 January 2022) located about 25 km south of Aalborg, near the main road between Aalborg and Hadsund. It was a part of the former Skørping Municipality, but after Kommunalreformen ("The Municipal Reform" of 2007), it is now part of the new Rebild Municipality.

References

Cities and towns in the North Jutland Region
Rebild Municipality